Pedro Armengol (c. 1238 - 27 April 1304), born Pedro Armengol Rocafort, was a Spanish Roman Catholic who was of noble stock and was a thief during his adolescence. He became a professed member of the Mercedarians after he experienced a sudden conversion and devoted himself from liberating persecuted Christians from the Moors.

Armengol is best known for being hanged while a captive of the Moors but survived the attempted killing.

He received canonization as a saint on 8 April 1687 after Pope Innocent XI approved his sainthood and his long-standing "cultus" - or devotion.

Life

Pedro Armengol Rocafort was born in Tarragona in 1238 to the nobleman Arnau Armengol Rocafort.

He became quite proud and competitive and was also strong-willed as an adolescent during which time he became a robber and formed a cohesive group of bandits with himself as its leader. In 1258 James I of Aragon travelled to Montpellier from Valencia in which Armengol's father was a soldier in the entourage. Armengol's bandits collided with the soldiers and father and son were soon recognized to each other during the skirmish. Armengol surrendered in tears upon this realization. In Barcelona he appealed for the pardon of James I - though his father's intervention granted him this.

His period of reflection while imprisoned caused a sudden religious conversion within him and he became resolved to become a professed religious. He became a member of the Mercedarians in 1258 and devoted himself to aiding persecuted Christians in liberating them from the Moors. In 1261 with William de Bas he was sent to Murcia and freed 213 captives from the Arabs and in 1262 went to Granada with Br. Bernard of San Romano in which the pair freed 202 prisoners. Armengol also went to Algiers in 1264 for the same mission and also went to Trangier and Oran.

In 1266 he and William de Bas went to Bejaia to free 18 captives but he was apprehended (since he wanted to take the place of those prisoners) and sentenced to be hanged. He endured much torture before he was hanged. Brother  The heartbroken William searched for his friend's remains to find him alive. He was hanged but the Blessed Mother came to his aid with the help of angels and stopped him from being killed. William arrived with a ransom but was told it would not be accepted since Armengol was hanged. William found him not long after to still be alive and freed him. Armengol told him of the vision he had and of his saviors. However the attempted execution would have a lasting impact on Armengol: it left his neck twisted and his face became quite haggard. The pair used the ransom to purchase the freedom of the captives and travelled back to Catalonia.

Armengol died on 27 April 1304. In 1646 the church he was buried in was burnt but his remains went undamaged. Minor modifications to his tomb were made in 1653.

Sainthood

On 28 March 1686 he was beatified after Pope Innocent XI approved his long-standing cultus and later canonized him as a saint on 8 April 1687. Pope Benedict XIV affixed his feast as being on 27 April - the date of his death - but it was moved in 1969 to 26 April due to the reform of the General Roman Calendar.

See also

References

External links
Saints SQPN

1238 births
1304 deaths
13th-century people from the Kingdom of Aragon
13th-century Roman Catholics
14th-century people from the Kingdom of Aragon
14th-century Roman Catholics
Order of the Blessed Virgin Mary of Mercy
People from Tarragona
Spanish Roman Catholic saints
Mercedarian saints
Beatifications by Pope Innocent XI
Canonizations by Pope Innocent XI